The 2017–18 season is the 93rd season in Rayo Vallecano ’s history.

Squad

Transfers
List of Spanish football transfers summer 2017#Rayo Vallecano

In

Out

Competitions

Overall

Liga

League table

Matches

Kickoff times are in CET.

Copa del Rey

Statistics

Appearances and goals

|-
! colspan=14 style=background:#dcdcdc; text-align:center|Goalkeepers

|-
! colspan=14 style=background:#dcdcdc; text-align:center|Defenders

 
|-
! colspan=14 style=background:#dcdcdc; text-align:center|Midfielders

|-
! colspan=14 style=background:#dcdcdc; text-align:center|Forwards

|-
! colspan=14 style=background:#dcdcdc; text-align:center|Players who have made an appearance this season but have left the club

|-
|}

References

Rayo Vallecano seasons
Rayo Vallecano